The Cobre Ridge caldera is a large Jurassic volcano in the U.S. state of Arizona.

References

External links

Calderas of Arizona
Jurassic calderas
VEI-8 volcanoes